This is a comprehensive discography of the Circle Jerks, a California-based punk rock band. They have released six studio albums, one live album, one compilation album, and one video album.

Biography
The Circle Jerks were formed in Southern California in 1979, and originally comprised Keith Morris on vocals, Greg Hetson on guitar, Roger Rogerson on bass and Lucky Lehrer on drums. Their debut album, Group Sex was released in 1980 on the Frontier Records label; its 14 songs totaled out at 15 minutes. It featured two songs that Morris had written while in Black Flag (Black Flag claimed the songs were "theirs") and one song Hetson wrote for his previous band, Redd Kross. That same year, the group was one of several California punk bands to be immortalized in the Penelope Spheeris documentary The Decline of Western Civilization; live versions of five songs from Group Sex appear on the movie's soundtrack.

In 1981, the group signed with IRS Records subsidiary Faulty Products and recorded their second release, Wild in the Streets, the title track of which is a cover version of a Garland Jeffreys tune. Faulty Products ceased operations several months after the release of the album, forcing Circle Jerks to find their third record deal in as many years. They signed a management deal with War producer/manager Jerry Goldstein's Far Out Productions, and recorded their third album, Golden Shower of Hits, in 1983, the album was released on Goldstein's LAX label. One of the songs from the album, "Coup d'État", was used in the soundtrack of Alex Cox's early film Repo Man, and the band makes an appearance playing an acoustic/lounge version of "When The Shit Hits The Fan". Not long after Repo Man had concluded its first-run release schedule, the Circle Jerks experienced its first lineup change, with Rogerson and Lehrer replaced by Earl Liberty and Chuck Biscuits, respectively.

In 1984, Liberty and Biscuits left the Circle Jerks and the band hired Zander Schloss and Keith Clark as Liberty and Biscuits' replacements. The new lineup recorded two more albums before the Circle Jerks split up for the first time in 1990, when Hetson left to tour and record albums with Bad Religion.

A long period of inactivity ended in 1994, when the Circle Jerks reunited and signed a major label deal with Mercury Records, a move that had a few business complications: Hetson was still with Bad Religion, who had signed a long-term contract with Atlantic Records, while Schloss had been part of a band contracted to Interscope. After ironing out these difficulties, the band recorded Oddities, Abnormalities and Curiosities, released in the summer of 1995, but broke up once again. Reasons for this breakup were essentially the same as they were in 1990.

The Circle Jerks reunited once again in 2001, with a new lineup of Morris on vocals, Hetson on guitar, Schloss on bass and Kevin Fitzgerald on drums, but lapsed into inactivity in 2010. According to Hetson, the Circle Jerks may never release a new studio album in the near future, despite the fact that they released one new song "I'm Gonna Live" on their Myspace in 2007.

Studio albums

Singles

Live albums

Compilation and soundtrack appearances

Music videos
 "Beverly Hills"/"Wasted" (1985)
 "I Wanna Destroy You" (1995)

Video albums

References

Punk rock group discographies
Discographies of American artists